The Pont Neuf Wrapped, Paris, 1975–1985 was a 1985 environmental artwork in which artists Christo and Jeanne-Claude wrapped the Pont Neuf in fabric. Planning for the project started in 1979. The artists put a model of the project in the window of La Samaritaine, a department store close to the bridge, in late 1981. Paris Mayor Jacques Chirac rejected the project in early 1982. An aide to the mayor snuck the permit approval into a pile of the mayor's papers, which he signed inadvertently in August 1984. When the mayor attempted to repeal the approval, Jeanne-Claude said she would show the press the letter as a symbol of his signature's worth, after which he dropped his case. In September 1985, the artists wrapped the bridge and its 44 streetlamps in a sandstone-colored fabric. The two-week installation attracted three million visitors. Artsy described the response as "sensational".

Notes

Bibliography 

 
 
 
 
 

1985 works
Works by Christo and Jeanne-Claude

External Links 
The Pont Neuf Wrapped on christojeanneclaude.net